Pasiphila magnimaculata is a moth in the family Geometridae. It is endemic to New Zealand. The type locality of this species is Queenstown. It usually inhabits montane areas but has also been collected on Quail Island.

The larvae feed on the flowers of Gaultheria crassa.

References

Moths described in 1915
magnimaculata
Moths of New Zealand
Endemic fauna of New Zealand
Endemic moths of New Zealand